Dialog, is a free weekly newspaper with only positive information and news from Varna city, Bulgaria, Europe.

The newspaper's first issue came out on 30 March 2007 with the biggest circulation in Varna region. The main idea of Dialog newspaper is to bring warmth and optimism, a sense for an orientation and direction in the world, to prove that life is a challenge and that it has to be lived in the best way. Its editor-in-chief is Svetlozar Nikolov.

External links 
The website of newspaper in Bulgarian language
English version of the site

Publications established in 2007
Weekly newspapers published in Bulgaria
Bulgarian-language newspapers
Mass media in Varna, Bulgaria